Laura Hall may refer to:

 Laura Hall (musician), American musician
 Laura Hall (politician) (born 1943), Alabama politician
 Laura Nelson Hall (1876–1936), actress
 Laura Ashley Hall, accomplice in the Murder of Jennifer Cave